RCRD LBL was a website for free, curated, and legal MP3 downloads from emergent artists.

RCRD LBL was launched in 2007 by Josh Deutsch, Peter Rojas and creative director Elliot Aronow, and featured thousands of free singles, remixes, exclusive tracks and rarities from a diverse, handpicked roster of artists. The site served up millions of downloads and plays per month.

As of November 2013, the site has been taken down and there have been no new posts on the site's Facebook or Twitter feeds since May 2013.

Management

References

American independent record labels
Record labels established in 2007
Alternative rock record labels
Indie rock record labels